I'll Paint You a Song is a compilation of the vocal tracks from the soundtrack albums Norwood and True Grit, plus "Private John Q," previously released as a 1965 Capitol single.

Track listing
Side 1:

 "I'll Paint You A Song" (Mac Davis) - 4:08
 "Marie" (M. Torok, R. Redd) - 2:34
 "Ol' Norwood's Comin' Home" (M. Torok, R. Redd) - 1:48
 "Everything A Man Could Ever Need" (Mac Davis) - 2:29

Side 2:

 "True Grit" (Don Black, Elmer Bernstein) - 2:29
 "The Repo Man" (Mac Davis) - 1:54
 "Norwood (Me And My Guitar)" (Mac Davis) - 2:37
 "Private John Q" (Roger Miller) - 1:53
 "Down Home" (Mac Davis) - 2:05

References

1971 compilation albums
Glen Campbell compilation albums
Pickwick Records compilation albums